Chichaklu Rural District is in Ahmadabad-e Mostowfi District of Eslamshahr County, Tehran province, Iran. At the most recent National Census of 2016, the population of the rural district was 4,624 in 1,379 households. The largest of its three villages was Chichaklu, with 2,656 people. The rural district was established on 16 April 2012.

References 

Eslamshahr County

Rural Districts of Tehran Province

Populated places in Tehran Province

Populated places in Eslamshahr County